Ramileh, Rumaila, Romeyleh, Rameyleh or Remeyleh may refer to:

 Rumeilah (Doha), a neighborhood of Doha, Qatar
 Rumeilah, Syria, a village in Aleppo Governorate, Syria
 Rumailah, Saudi Arabia
 Rumailah, UAE
 Rameyleh, Hormozgan, Iran
 Ramileh, Khuzestan, Iran
 Romeyleh-ye Olya, Khuzestan Province, Iran
 Romeyleh-ye Sofla, Khuzestan Province, Iran
 Salah al-Din Square, Cairo, historically known as Rumaila Square